Paul Stefan, born Paul Stefan Grünfeld (25 November 1879, in Brno – 12 November 1943, in New York City) was an Austrian music historian and critic.

Born into an assimilated Jewish family, Paul Stefan came to live in Vienna in 1898. He attended courses in law, philosophy and art history at the University of Vienna, before studying music theory with Hermann Graedener and possibly composition under Arnold Schoenberg. From 1922 to 1937 he edited the Austrian music journal Musikblätter des Anbruch (entitled simply Anbruch from 1929).

Works
 Gustav Mahler; eine studie über persönlichkeit und werk, Münich: R. Piper & Co., 1910. Translated to English as Gustav Mahler: a study of his personality and work, 1913.
 Arturo Toscanini, 1927
 Anton Dvořák, 1939
 Verdi, the man in his letters, 1942

References

External link

1879 births
1943 deaths
Austrian Jews
Austrian music critics
20th-century Austrian historians
Music historians
Knights of the Order of the White Lion
Mahler scholars
Austrian emigrants to the United States
Historians from the Austro-Hungarian Empire